Masoom is an Indian Hindi-language psychological thriller streaming television series created by Gurmeet Singh based on 2018 Irish Drama Series, Blood by Sophie Petzal for Disney+ Hotstar. The series stars Boman Irani, Samara Tijori, Upasana Singh, Manjari Phadnis,Saariika Singh, Veer Rajwant Singh and Manu Rishi in the lead roles. The series is scheduled to premiere on June 17, 2022.

Cast
Boman Irani as Dr. Balraj Kapoor
Samara Tijori as Sana
Manjari Fadnis as Sanjana
Upasana Singh as Dr. Gunwant
Manu Rishi
Veer Rajwant Singh
Saariika Singh
Sukhpal Singh
Nikhil Nair
Akashdeep Arora
Jobanpreet Singh

References

External links
 
 Masoom on Disney+ Hotstar

2022 web series debuts
Indian web series
Indian drama web series
Hindi-language web series
Thriller web series
Psychological thriller web series
Hindi-language Disney+ Hotstar original programming